Robert Wood Johnson High School is a public high school located in Gainesville, Georgia, United States, operated by the Hall County School District. The school serves 1,600 students in grades 9 to 12.

About Johnson
Robert Wood Johnson High School was built in 1972 by the Hall County Board of Education under the direction of Superintendent Dean Myers.  The school is named after the Johnson & Johnson Corporation's founder; the corporation owned a large piece of land in South Hall County and gave a small piece to the Board of Education as long as they in turn would name the school Robert Wood Johnson High School.  The school at one time was called Robert Wood Johnson Memorial Comprehensive High School.

Johnson High School added a vocational wing in 1973.

The school's first principal was Donald Loggins.

In 1982 the Frank J. Knight Center was dedicated. This is home to many PE classes, basketball, volleyball, and school assemblies.

In 1990 a stadium was built for football and soccer.  Nicknamed "The Dungeon," the official name of the facility is "Billy Ellis Memorial Stadium," after a former principal who died of cancer.

In 1996, the Performing Arts Center was built between the main building and the Frank J. Knight Center.  This building is home to drama classes and chorus and band performances, and is referred to as the PAC.

Feeder schools
Chestnut Mountain Elementary School
Chicopee Woods Elementary School
Lyman Hall Elementary School
Martin Elementary School
Myers Elementary School
South Hall Middle School
Sugar Hill Elementary School

Notable alumni
 Casey Cagle, Lt. Governor of Georgia, 2007-2019
 A.J. Styles, professional wrestler
 Chester Willis, former NFL football player
 Mike "MoonPie" Wilson, former NFL football player

References

Educational institutions established in 1972
Schools in Hall County, Georgia
Public high schools in Georgia (U.S. state)
International Baccalaureate schools in Georgia (U.S. state)
Gainesville, Georgia
1972 establishments in Georgia (U.S. state)